Éditions Mille-Îles is a Canadian French-language publisher of comics founded in 1988.

History
Mille-Îles began in 1988 with Tristan Demers' Gargouille, a series for children, and the adult comics album La Vie qu'on mène by Line Arsenault.  They have since expanded into a wide variety of genres, and have a number of imprints.   By the beginning of the 21st century, they had become the largest Québec-based publisher of comics.

Imprints
Mille-Îles has a number of imprints:
BD Mille-Îles – specializes in children's comics
Coup de Griffe – specializes in humour
Dérive (later Fondation)
Zone Convective – founded by Yves Millet, bought by Mille-Îles in 1999

See also

Canadian comics
Quebec comics

References

Quebec comics
Comic book publishing companies of Canada
1988 establishments in Quebec
Publishing companies established in 1988